Gryżyce may refer to the following places in Poland:
Gryżyce, Lower Silesian Voivodeship (south-west Poland)
Gryżyce, Lubusz Voivodeship (west Poland)